Belle Plaine is a village in the Canadian province of Saskatchewan within the Rural Municipality of Pense No. 160 and Census Division No. 6. Belle Plaine is located on Highway 1 (also known as the Trans Canada Highway), 21 kilometres east of the City of Moose Jaw in south-central Saskatchewan. Buffalo Pound Provincial Park and Regina Beach are located near Belle Plaine.

History 
Belle Plaine incorporated as a village on August 12, 1910.

Demographics 

Business 
 Mosaic Potash Mine at Belle Plaine
 Terra Grain Fuels Ethanol Facility
 Yara Belle Plaine - fertilizer production plant

Attractions 
 Qu'Appelle River Dam

Infrastructure 
Transportation
Highway 642
Highway 1

See also

 List of communities in Saskatchewan
 List of villages in Saskatchewan

References

Villages in Saskatchewan
Pense No. 160, Saskatchewan
Division No. 6, Saskatchewan